Lestoidea barbarae is a species of Australian damselfly in the family Lestoideidae,
commonly known as a large bluestreak. 
It has only been recorded from the vicinity of Wooroonooran National Park, in north-east Queensland, where it inhabits streams in rainforest.

Lestoidea barbarae is a medium-sized to large damselfly, dark coloured with dull orange to greenish markings.

Etymology
In 1967, Tony Watson named this species of dragonfly, barbarae, for his wife, Barbara.

Gallery

See also
 List of Odonata species of Australia

References 

Lestoideidae
Odonata of Australia
Insects of Australia
Endemic fauna of Australia
Taxa named by J.A.L. (Tony) Watson
Insects described in 1967
Damselflies